Mile-a-Minute Romeo is a 1923 American silent Western film directed by Lambert Hillyer and written by Robert N. Lee. It is based on the 1922 novel Gun Gentlemen by Max Brand. The film stars Tom Mix, Betty Jewel, J. Gordon Russell, James Mason, Duke R. Lee and James Quinn. The film was released on November 18, 1923, by Fox Film Corporation.

Cast       
 Tom Mix as Lucky Bill
 Betty Jewel as Molly
 J. Gordon Russell as Landry
 James Mason as Morgan 
 Duke R. Lee as Sheriff 
 James Quinn as Coroner
 Charles K. French as Sheriff
 Tony the Horse as Tony the Horse

References

External links
 

1923 films
1923 Western (genre) films
Fox Film films
Films directed by Lambert Hillyer
American black-and-white films
Silent American Western (genre) films
1920s English-language films
1920s American films